Lesser Mackellar Island is a small island immediately northeast of Greater Mackellar Island in the Mackellar Islands of Antarctica, lying  north of Cape Denison in the center of Commonwealth Bay. It was discovered and named by the Australasian Antarctic Expedition (1911–14) under Douglas Mawson. The name is indicative of the size of the feature in relation to Greater Mackellar Island.

Important Bird Area
The island forms part of the Mackellar Islands Important Bird Area (IBA), identified as such by BirdLife International because it supports large breeding colonies of Adélie penguins.

See also 
 List of Antarctic and Subantarctic islands

References

External links 

Important Bird Areas of Antarctica
Penguin colonies
Islands of George V Land